The Kimberley Plateau dtella (Gehyra occidentalis) is a species of gecko endemic to Western Australia.

References

Gehyra
Reptiles described in 2022
Geckos of Australia